Spirurida is an order of spirurian nematodes. Like all nematodes, they have neither a circulatory nor a respiratory system. 

Some Spirurida, like the genus Gongylonema, can cause disease in humans. One such disease is a skin infection with Spirurida larvae, called "creeping disease". Some species are known as eyeworms and infect the orbital cavity of animal hosts.

Systematics
The Camallanida are sometimes included herein as a suborder, and the Drilonematida are sometimes placed here as a superfamily. There are doubts about the internal systematics of the Spirurida, and some groups placed herein might belong to other spirurian or even secernentean lineages.

The following superfamilies are at least provisionally placed in the Spirurida:
 Acuarioidea
 Aproctoidea
 Diplotriaenoidea
 Filarioidea
 Gnathostomatoidea
 Habronematoidea
 Physalopteroidea
 Rictularioidea
 Spiruroidea
 Thelazioidea

References

Citations

Sources 
  (2002): Nematoda. Version of 2002-JAN-01. Retrieved 2008-NOV-02.

External links 
 

 
Nematode orders